Henry W. Lynch (April 8, 1866 – November 23, 1925) was a professional baseball player. He played part of one season in Major League Baseball, appearing in four games for the Chicago Colts in 1893 as a right fielder.

References

Major League Baseball outfielders
Chicago Colts players
Lynn Lions players
Salem Fairies players
Lynn Shoemakers players
Worcester Grays players
Hartford (minor league baseball) players
New Haven (minor league baseball) players
Troy Trojans (minor league) players
Worcester (minor league baseball) players
Binghamton Bingos players
Elmira Gladiators players
Springfield Ponies players
Springfield Maroons players
Rochester Blackbirds players
Rochester Brownies players
Montreal Royals players
Providence Clamdiggers (baseball) players
Providence Grays (minor league) players
Syracuse Stars (minor league baseball) players
Toronto Canucks players
Manchester (minor league baseball) players
Buffalo Bisons (minor league) players
Baseball players from Worcester, Massachusetts
19th-century baseball players
1866 births
1925 deaths